Douglas A. Mitchell is a Professor of Chemistry at the University of Illinois at Urbana-Champaign. He holds an affiliate appointment in the Department of Microbiology and is a faculty member of the Carl R. Woese Institute for Genomic Biology. His research focuses on the chemical biology of natural products. He is known mainly for his work on the biosynthetic enzymology of ribosomally synthesized and post-translationally modified peptides (RiPPs) and genome-guided natural product discovery.

Early life and education
Mitchell was born in western Pennsylvania and obtained his B.S. in Chemistry from Carnegie Mellon University in 2002. He obtained his PhD in 2006 from the University of California, Berkeley and worked with Michael Marletta on the nitric oxide-dependent post-translational modifications of proteins. For postdoctoral studies, he worked with Jack Dixon at the University of California, San Diego and pursued the study of Streptococcal toxin biosynthesis. In 2009, he began his independent career at the  University of Illinois at Urbana–Champaign as an Assistant Professor of Chemistry. In 2015, he was promoted to Associate Professor with tenure.

Research interests
 Natural products
 Genome-mining
 Antibiotic resistance
 Mechanistic enzymology

Notable awards
 NIH Director’s New Innovator Award
 Pfizer Award in Enzyme Chemistry
 Packard Fellowship for Science and Engineering
 Camille Dreyfus Teacher-Scholar Award
 National Fresenius Award

External links
 Mitchell Laboratory Website
 RODEO: For ribosomal natural product discovery

References

Carnegie Mellon University alumni
21st-century American chemists
Living people
1980 births